Monophlebidae is a family of scale insects commonly known as the giant scales or monophlebids. They occur in most parts of the world but more genera are found in the tropics than elsewhere.

The cottony cushion scale, Icerya purchasi, is a serious commercial pest on many families of woody plants, including Citrus. It has spread worldwide from Australia.

Taxonomy
At one time, Monophlebidae was considered to be a subfamily of Margarodidae. However the family Margarodidae showed great morphological and biological variation and Maskell first recognised Monophlebidae as a separate family in 1880. The giant scales are morphologically diverse but they appear to be a monophyletic group.

Hosts
Giant scales occur on a wide range of host plants but most of these are trees or woody shrubs.

Description
Giant scales have an elongated oval body; many species grow to a length of one centimetre long and the African species Aspidoproctus maximus achieves 35 mm long. The adult females of the family have six dark coloured legs and conspicuous antennae. Most genera have a waxy coating but some do not. Various species have some form of ovisac or marsupium.

Life cycle
Giant scales infest the stems, branches and leaves of their host plant. They mostly have four female and five male instars. The prepupal instar are mobile, unlike most members of other scale families. They may have wing buds and the legs and antennae are well developed.

Genera

Afrodrosicha
Aspidoproctus
Buchnericoccus
Conifericoccus
Corandesia
Crypticerya
Drosicha
Drosichoides
Echinicerya
Etropera
Gigantococcus
Gueriniella
Gullania
Hemaspidoproctus
Icerya
Insulococcus
Jansenus
Labioproctus
Laurencella
Lecaniodrosicha
Llaveia
Llaveiella
Matesovia
Melaleucococcus
Misracoccus
Modicicoccus
Monophlebidus
Monophleboides
Monophlebulus 
Monophlebus
Nautococcus
Neogreenia
Neohodgsonius
Nietnera
Nodulicoccus
Palaeococcus
Paracoelostoma
Paramoandesia
Peengea
Perissopneumon
Protortonia
Pseudaspidoproctus
Sishania
Steatococcus
Tessarobelus
Vrydagha
Walkeriana

See also
Drosicha corpulenta
Icerya purchasi

References

 
Scale insects
Hemiptera families
Archaeococcoids